Boss of All Bosses is the second solo studio album by American rapper Slim Thug from Houston, Texas. It was released on March 24, 2009, by his Boss Hogg Outlawz label, distributed by E1 Music. The album features guest appearances from Mannie Fresh, Z-Ro, Mike Jones, Scarface and UGK, while the production on the album was primarily handled by Mr. Lee, along with several producers, including Jim Jonsin, Mr. Rogers, and Bigg Tyme, among others.

Upon its release, the album was met with generally favorable reviews from music critics and publications. Boss of All Bosses debuted at number 15 on the US Billboard 200, selling 32,000 copies in its first week.

Singles 
The album's lead single, titled "I Run" was released on November 11, 2008. The song features guest vocals from American hip hop recording artist Yelawolf, with a production on the song being handled by Jim Jonsin. This song contains a sample of the chorus, of which was based on the song "I Ran (So Far Away)" performed by A Flock of Seagulls, but with different lyrics ("I run the streets all night and day").

The album's second single, "Thug" was released on November 17, 2009. The song was produced by Mr. Lee.

Critical reception 

Boss of All Bosses received a generally positive reception from music critics who saw it as an improvement over his major label debut Already Platinum. AllMusic's David Jeffries praised the album for being a return to Slim's early mixtape years, concluding that "this raw album is a welcome throwback that no longtime fan should be without." Pedro Hernandez of RapReviews praised the production for being a return to the Southern sound and Slim for expressing his voice through different topics throughout the whole album, saying that it "sounds like the triumphant introduction to Thug's unique brand of Texas rap rather than Thug trying to conform to the current trends." DJBooth gave a mixed review of the album, saying that some of the songs' lyrical material and production was given some flair but others felt by-the-numbers despite Slim's performance, concluding that, "All things considered, Slim Thug can still maintain his administrative position in the game despite this sophomore slump."

Track listing 

Notes
 "Smile" features additional vocals by J. Lacy.

Sample credits
 "I Run" contains a sample of "I Ran (So Far Away)" performed by A Flock of Seagulls.
 "Top Drop" contains a sample of "Love Is What You Make It" performed by Masterpiece.
 "Thug" contains a sample of "Eazy-Duz-It" performed by Eazy-E.
 "My Bitch" contains a sample of "Faded Pictures" performed by Case and Joe.
 "Hard" contains a sample of "Hard Knocks" performed by Marc Broussard.

Charts

Weekly charts

Year-end charts

References

External links

2009 albums
E1 Music albums
Slim Thug albums
Albums produced by Jim Jonsin
Albums produced by Mannie Fresh